In mathematics, the arithmetic zeta function is a zeta function associated with a scheme of finite type over integers. The arithmetic zeta function generalizes the Riemann zeta function and Dedekind zeta function to higher dimensions. The arithmetic zeta function is one of the most-fundamental objects of number theory.

Definition
The arithmetic zeta function  is defined by an Euler product analogous to the Riemann zeta function:

where the product is taken over all closed points  of the scheme . Equivalently, the product is over all points whose residue field is finite. The cardinality of this field is denoted .

Examples and properties

Varieties over a finite field
If  is the spectrum of a finite field with  elements, then

For a variety X over a finite field, it is known by Grothendieck's trace formula that

where  is a rational function (i.e., a quotient of polynomials).

where  denotes the multiplication in the ring  of Witt vectors of the integers.

Ring of integers

If  is the spectrum of the ring of integers, then  is the Riemann zeta function. More generally, if  is the spectrum of the ring of integers of an algebraic number field, then  is the Dedekind zeta function.

Zeta functions of disjoint unions
The zeta function of affine and projective spaces over a scheme  are given by

Even more generally, a similar formula holds for infinite disjoint unions.

Such an expression ranging over each prime number is sometimes called Euler product and each factor is called Euler factor. In many cases of interest, the generic fiber  is smooth. Then, only finitely many  are singular (bad reduction). Therefore, these two functions are closely related.

Main conjectures
There are a number of conjectures concerning the behavior of the zeta function of a regular irreducible equidimensional scheme  (of finite type over the integers). Many (but not all) of these conjectures generalize the one-dimensional case of well known theorems about the Euler-Riemann-Dedekind zeta function.

This is referred to as the characteristic  case below. In the latter case, many of these conjectures (with the most notable exception of the Birch and Swinnerton-Dyer conjecture, i.e. the study of special values) are known.

Meromorphic continuation and functional equation

The generalized Riemann hypothesis

This was proved (Emil Artin, Helmut Hasse, André Weil, Alexander Grothendieck, Pierre Deligne) in positive characteristic for all . The Riemann hypothesis is a partial case of Conjecture 2.

Pole orders
Secondly, Tate conjectured

i.e., the pole order is expressible by the rank of the groups of invertible regular functions and the Picard group. The Birch and Swinnerton-Dyer conjecture is a partial case this conjecture. In fact, this conjecture of Tate's is equivalent to a generalization of Birch and Swinnerton-Dyer.

More generally, Soulé conjectured

These ranks are finite under the Bass conjecture.

These conjectures are known when , that is, the case of number rings and curves over finite fields.

Methods and theories
The arithmetic zeta function of a regular connected equidimensional arithmetic scheme of Kronecker dimension  can be factorized into the product of appropriately defined -factors and an auxiliary factor. Hence, results on -functions imply corresponding results for the arithmetic zeta functions. However, there is still very little amount of proven results about the -factors of arithmetic schemes in characteristic zero and dimensions 2 and higher. Ivan Fesenko initiated  a theory which studies the arithmetic zeta functions directly, without working with their -factors. It is a higher-dimensional generalisation of Tate's thesis, i.e. it uses higher adele groups, higher zeta integral and objects which come from higher class field theory. In this theory, the meromorphic continuation and functional equation of proper regular models of elliptic curves over global fields is related to mean-periodicity property of a boundary function. In his joint work  with M. Suzuki and G. Ricotta a new correspondence in number theory is proposed, between the arithmetic zeta functions and mean-periodic functions in the space of smooth functions on the real line of not more than exponential growth. This correspondence is related to the Langlands correspondence. Two other applications of Fesenko's theory are to the poles of the zeta function of proper models of elliptic curves over global fields and to the special value at the central point.

References 

Sources
 
 

Zeta and L-functions
Number theory